Li Qingyu was a Chinese diplomat. He was Ambassador of the People's Republic of China to Syria (1993–1995) and Algeria (1995–1999).

References

Ambassadors of China to Syria
Ambassadors of China to Algeria
Living people
Year of birth missing (living people)